Remittances to Nepal are money transfers from Nepalese workers employed outside the country to friends or relatives in Nepal and forms part of the wider global remittance transfers by migrant workers back to their home countries.

It is said that remittances has represented more than 20 percent of GDP in Nepal in the year 2017 onwards. Moreover, it would be highly beneficial to the country, where there is natural calamities, political conflict, people war, low investment in entrepreneurial activities and economic recession.  In the financial year (FY) 2000/01, the banking sector showed that NPR 15.9 billion was received.

Money is brought to Nepal by Multiple Remittance Companies via its Global Principal Partners Networks, Among the Major Remittance Companies Top 5 Remittance companies are IME Ltd., followed by GME Remittance & City Express there after E-Sewa & Nepali Remit.

Amount 
Remittances size in FY 2020/21 is around $9.2 bn a  approx. 23.2% to Nepal's annual income GDP. In fact, the figure is probably substantially higher as remittances are routinely underestimated; the rule of thumb is to add 65% to the official figures. Not all money is sent through legal/verifiable sources.

Social impact 
According to World Bank figures, extreme poverty has declined from almost 70% to 25% in the last 15 years, and the extra billions arriving directly to Nepalese households during this period are undoubtedly part of the story, along with large-scale state investment in social sectors and infrastructure.

The social impacts of such migration are likely to be at least as profound as the financial ones, particularly with regard to family and gender relations. In some Nepalese villages, up to 90% of the young men have left, returning at most every six months. In a case that hit the Nepalese media, there were not enough men left in one particular village to carry a coffin, meaning women had to – women traditionally do not even attend funerals.

Men (and some women) who would have previously expected to spend all of their lives in one place are travelling in groups to new areas, and sexual promiscuity is one inevitable consequence. HIV appears to be significantly higher than the national average among migrants and divorces are on the increase.

One research demonstrated two important results: (i) migration negatively affects agriculture yield and (ii) remittance-receiving agriculture households have not demonstrated improvements in agriculture productivity despite increased household incomes. This paper recommends the need for measures to incentivize remittance-receiving agriculture households to invest in capital goods and inputs to improve agriculture productivity so that it more than compensates for the yield losses arising from labor migration.

On the positive side, it is possible that the ongoing process of women's empowerment has been speeded up in some parts of Nepal. Fertility has fallen by 30% in the last decade, according to the World Bank. With fewer men around, women are forced to take more of a lead in household and community decisions, including managing limited funds. Women's increased decision-making control is one key factor in the rapid improvement in maternal health in Nepal in the last two decades, including a halving of maternal mortality. This is despite the "brain drain" of Nepal's trained health workers from Nepalese health facilities, another classic consequence of increased migration.

References

External links 
 World Bank Comparison of Remittances to Nepal

Remittances
Economy of Nepal
Nepalese diaspora